Utricularia schultesii is a small, terrestrial, perennial carnivorous plant that belongs to the genus Utricularia. U. schultesii is endemic to South America, where it is only known from the type location in Colombia and additional collections in Venezuela. It was published and described by Alvaro Fernández-Pérez in 1964.

See also 
 List of Utricularia species

References 

Carnivorous plants of South America
Flora of Colombia
Flora of Venezuela
schultesii